The Secretary of State's Register of Culturally Significant Property (Secretary’s Register) is an honorific listing of diplomatic properties that figure prominently in the international or architectural heritage of the United States. It was founded in 2000 as a White House Millennium Project, in equation of the National Register of Historic Places for domestic properties maintained by the  Secretary of the Interior. These historic places include chanceries, residences, office buildings, a museum, a cemetery, and a guest house; the properties are either owned or leased by the U.S. Department of State at the time of designation.

Properties are placed on the Secretary’s Register biannually. To be eligible for consideration, a nominated property must demonstrate an association with an important aspect of American diplomatic history and be included in the U.S. Department of State Bureau of Overseas Buildings Operations (OBO) List of Significant Properties.  

In addition to the preliminary requirements, seven criteria are used to evaluate nominated properties for inclusion in the Secretary's Register:

Designation or acknowledgment by a government as a significant property
Part of the United States' overseas heritage
Association with a significant historical event or person
Important architecture and/or by an important architect
Distinctive theme or assembly
Unique object or visual feature
Archaeological site

The Secretary's Register is instrumental in promoting the preservation of American history and architecture overseas and the conservation of cultural heritage in partnership with host governments. The State Department owns or has under long-term lease over 3,500 properties at 289 diplomatic posts worldwide. Of these, 39 are recognized as landmark American properties abroad with listing in the Secretary's Register.

Culturally Significant Places
The following is a list of the Department of State's culturally significant places honored in the Secretary's Register. Many of these are currently used as the embassy or residence of the United States ambassadors to their respective countries.

Ambassador's Residence, Hanoi
Ambassador’s Residence, Helsinki 
Ambassador’s Residence, Lima 
Ambassador’s Residence, Stockholm 
Ambassador’s Residence, Tokyo
Ambassador's Summer Residence, Baguio
American Cemetery, Tripoli
Athens Chancery, Athens
Blair House, Washington, D.C.
Budapest Chancery, Budapest
Byne House, Madrid
Carlucci House, Lisbon 
Chief Secretary’s Lodge, Dublin 
Consular Academy, Vienna 
Dublin Chancery, Dublin 
Florence Consulate, Florence
Former Consulate General, Alexandria
Ho Chi Minh City, former U.S. Embassy Saigon Site
, Paris
Hôtel Rothschild, Paris
Manila Chancery, Manila
New Delhi Chancery, New Delhi
Palacio Bosch, Buenos Aires
Palazzo Corpi, Istanbul
Palazzo Margherita and Twin Villas, Rome
Roosevelt House, Curacao 
Roosevelt House, New Delhi 
Tangier Old Legation, Tangier
Tirana Chancery, Tirana
Truman Hall, Brussels
Schoenborn Palace, Prague
Seoul Old American Legation Site, Seoul
Spaso House, Moscow
Winfield House, London
Villa Petschek, Prague
Villa Mirador, Casablanca
Villa Montfeld, Algiers
Villa Otium, Oslo
Villa Taverna, Rome

See also
 National Historic Landmarks
 National Register of Historic Places

References

Sources
US Department of State brochure on Culturally Significant Property, 2010 (PDF, Internet Archive)

 
United States Department of State
Heritage registers in the United States